Ellen Arkbro (born 1990) is a Swedish avant-garde composer working largely in meantone temperament. Her primary instrument is the pipe organ, and she also composes for brass and winds. Her early work makes ample use of the text-based programming environment SuperCollider as a tonality design resource in which "there are some very natural ways of working with rational frequency relationships."

Early life
Arkbro was born in Stockholm. Excelling in church choir she resolved to study jazz, only to find that jazz depressingly compelled her to seek an opposite aesthetic direction. After attending Elektronmusikstudion in Stockholm, and upon completing a degree in electroacoustic composition at the Royal College of Music in Stockholm, Arkbro studied just intonation under the tutelage of LaMonte Young, Marian Zazeela and Jung Hee Choi in New York and Marc Sabat in Berlin.

Recordings

For Organ and Brass
For her 2017 debut album For Organ and Brass, Arkbro, who was raised Baptist, uses the Sherer-Orgel organ at St. Stephen's Church in Tangermünde, Germany, an instrument dating to 1624, in a church dating to 1118. The LP comprises recordings of her compositions in just intonation for renaissance organ, horn, trombone and microtonal tuba.

CHORDS
CHORDS (2019) was designed to draw attention to the way sound exists in space, the way tonality and harmony affect an environment. The music is intended for large speakers, allowing it to take over a home and envelop the listener.

Pitchfork finds that the album "delves even deeper into microtonal interplay, balancing heady theoretical terrain with a rare emotional resonance. [Arkbro's] music is infused with a profound emotionality that transcends its heady origins. Passing through the gates of extreme rigor, CHORDS finds private infinity in a handful or stretched-out drones."

Sounds while waiting 
Sounds while waiting (2021) is an album that explores the long drawn out manner of playing chords in a resonant space. It focuses on exploring the depths of a "rough, focused and yet strangely transparent" form of "texturality". The instrumentation consists of organ and cymbals and the album contains the two-parter "Sculpture", along with 2 others.

I get along without you very well 
I get along without you very well (2022), a collaboration with Swedish multi-instrumentalist Johan Graden, is an LP of songs that introduces Arkbro as a vocalist. The instrumentation is percussion, clarinet, organ, and brass. Each piece is, in its way, meandering, improvisatory, and drawn-out to an extreme, "wistfully throwing up a handful of ideas and letting them float in the breeze, employing the faintest of structures to lure them back to earth."

Concerts
During the coronavirus pandemic in 2021, Arkbro performed at the medieval Church of São Martinho de Cedofeita, in the municipality of Porto, Portugal.

Discography

Hästköttskandalen
2015: Spacegirls (Fylkingen Records)

Solo
2017: For Organ and Brass (Subtext Recordings)
2019: CHORDS (Subtext Recordings)
2021: Sounds while waiting (s/r)

Collaboration
2022: (with Johan Graden) I get along without you very well (Thrill Jockey)

References

External links
Official website

Ellen Arkbro on NTS Radio

Hör ny musik av Ellen Arkbro, Sveriges Radio, January 22, 2020.

1990 births
Swedish women composers
21st-century composers
Just intonation composers
Experimental composers
Microtonal composers
Royal College of Music, Stockholm alumni
Living people
21st-century Swedish musicians
21st-century women composers
Composers for carillon